Kanna or Kana was a town of ancient Lycaonia, inhabited in Roman and Byzantine times, when it was a bishopric suffragan of Iconium.

Its site is located near Beşağıl, Karatay, Konya Province, Turkey.

References

Populated places in ancient Lycaonia
Former populated places in Turkey
Roman towns and cities in Turkey
Populated places of the Byzantine Empire
History of Konya Province